Octave Victor Anna Dierckx (15 October 1882 – 21 March 1955) was a  Belgian liberal and politician. Dierckx was a doctor in law and a lawyer.

Political career
 municipality Council member in Elsene
 1929–1955: senator
 1933–1934: President of the Liberal Party
 1934–1935: minister of transportation
 1937–1938: minister of the interior
 1938–1939: minister of public education
 1949–1950: minister without portfolio

Sources
 Presidents of the Belgian liberal party

1882 births
1955 deaths

Flemish politicians
Belgian Ministers of State